Château Dauzac is a winery in the Margaux appellation of the Bordeaux region of France, in the commune of Labarde. The wine produced here was classified as one of eighteen Cinquièmes Crus (Fifth Growths) in the Bordeaux Wine Official Classification of 1855. It is now a family winery and owned by the Roulleau family.

History

The beginning
 1190: The oldest known owner in this sector of Margaux was Pétrus d’Auzac. He received the land from Richard I, “Richard the Lionheart”, King of England, Count of Poitiers, Duke of Aquitaine, Count of Maine and Count of Anjou.
 1545: The Benedictine monks of the Sainte-Croix de Bordeaux Abbey were the first to mention, in their records as early as 1545, the “Bourdieu” de Dauzac estate, “Bourdieu” then referring to a farmhouse with a vineyard.
 1622: le « bourdieu de Dauzac » belonged to Jean Cousseau.
 1671: Jean Cousseau let the estate to local Carmelite nuns.
 1685: Pierre Drouillard bought Dauzac from the Carmelite nuns.
 1708: When Pierre Drouillard died in 1708, his wife Elizabeth Noguès will managed the estate until their daughter Elisabeth Drouillard, married with the "comte Lynch", will take over the estate in 1740. They have 3 children : the elder Jean-Baptiste Lynch, mayor of Bordeaux (from 1809 to 1815 who passed at château Dauzac) ; the second son, Thomas-Michel Lynch and their daughter Peggy Elise Lynch. The Lynch family also own the wineries that will eventually become Lynch-Bages & Lynch-Moussas.
 1841: Thomas Diedrich Wiebroock purchased Chateau Dauzac from the Lynch family who owned the estate for about 100 years. Under their management, Chateau Dauzac became Grand Cru Classé in 1855.
 1863: From 1863 to 1939, the powerful Johnston family owned Dauzac. This ownership combined with the knowledge of CEO Ernst David Dauzac brought Dauzac to the forefront of the Médoc wine scene. In the 1880s, the tests which led to the development of the Bordeaux mixture to combat downy mildew took place mostly in the vineyards of Château Dauzac. They were conducted by professor Pierre-Marie-Alexis Millardet, assisted by Dauzac's technical director Ernest David.

Modern history
Few owners followed including Jean-Jacques Bernat (1939), the Miailhe family (1966), Felix Chatelier (1978), MAIF (1989). In 2020 the Roulleau family (Groupe FOR-BZH) acquired Chateau Dauzac.

Vineyard

Size & grapes
The average age of vines is around 30 years.

Low-intervention wines
Today, the idea of low-intervention wines has exploded. “The category may still have only a small impact commercially,” says New York Times wine editor Eric Asimov, “but its impact culturally is huge, and growing”. Philippe Roux, technical director at Ch. Dauzac in Margaux, goes even further, saying, “Low-intervention wines are not about fashion but a social change.” When the director of an 1855 classified estate in Bordeaux starts throwing phrases like this around, you know there’s something going on.

Innovation

Thermoregulation
Mr Bernat, the owner of Glacières Bernat, acquired Château Dauzac in 1939. In order to regulate the temperature of vats, he came up with the idea of putting blocks of ice in them during fermentation, thus paving the way for thermoregulation.

Bouillie bordelaise
In the 19th century, several outbreaks of vine diseases occurred among the Vitis vinifera vines of the classical European wine regions. These outbreaks were caused by pests to which these vines lacked resistance, carried on vines brought to Europe as botanical specimens of American origin. These pests included not only the Great French Wine Blight caused by the aphid Phylloxera vastatrix, but also mildew and other diseases caused by fungi.

After the downy mildew had struck, botany professor Pierre-Marie-Alexis Millardet of the University of Bordeaux studied the disease in vineyards of the Bordeaux region. Millardet then noted that vines closest to the roads did not show mildew, while all other vines were affected. After inquiries, he found out those vines had been sprayed with a mixture of CuSO4 and lime to deter passersby from eating the grapes, since this treatment was both visible and bitter-tasting. This led Millardet to conduct trials with this treatment. The trials primarily took place in the vineyards of Château Dauzac, where he was assisted by Ernest David, Dauzac's technical director. Millardet published his findings in 1885, and recommended the mixture to combat downy mildew.

In France, the use of Bordeaux mixture has also been known as the Millardet-David treatment.

Dauzac wines

Chateau Dauzac 
Château Dauzac continues to promote its status as a pioneer of technological and agricultural progress, and has experimented with several innovative practices (bouillie bordelaise, temperature-control, oak vats with two transparent staves, etc.). This Margauz estate is one of the most invested in biodiversity, producing wines that truly reflect their terroir.

Aurore de Dauzac 
Produced from vines on a specific geological vein with fine and sandy gravel, the plot selection of Aurore de Dauzac provides a wine characterized by crisp and intense fruitiness. Merlot and Cabernet Sauvignon are used in almost equal proportions, resulting in a nicely balanced style. Aurore de Dauzac offers instant pleasure.

Harvested from the best parts of the Dauzac vineyard for Cabernet Sauvignon, this wine has ripe tannins and juicy, jammy black fruits.

Labastide Dauzac 
Soft and open, this wine is full of blackberry fruits.

Le Haut-Médoc de Dauzac 
The high percentage of cabernet-sauvignon (66%) dominate this wine, with flavors of red fruits like currant.

D de Dauzac 
Château Dauzac continued to innovate by producing a vegan wine (D de Dauzac).

Gallery

References

External links 
Château Dauzac official site
Chateau Dauzac Instagram page

Bordeaux wine producers